Elections to East Renfrewshire Council were held on 6 April 1995 and were the first for the newly formed Unitary authority for East Renfrewshire Council, which was created under the Local Government etc (Scotland) Act 1994. They resulted in the council falling under no overall control.

East Renfrewshire is one of 32 council areas of Scotland. The East Renfrewshire Council was established pursuant to the Local Government etc (Scotland) Act of 1994 from the previous Eastwood District and part of Renfrew District and elections were held in 1995.

After the election, a coalition was formed between Labour, the Liberal Democrats and Independent councilor Pearce.

Aggregate results

Ward Results

References

1995 Scottish local elections
1995